The Lost Paradise is a 1914 American  drama film directed by J. Searle Dawley and written by Henry C. DeMille and Ludwig Fulda. The film stars H. B. Warner, Catherine Carter, Mark Price, Arthur Hoops, Rita Stan, Amy Summers and Phillips Tead. The film was released on September 1, 1914, by Paramount Pictures.

Plot

Cast 
H. B. Warner as Reuben Warren
Catherine Carter as Margaret Knowlton
Mark Price as Andrew Knowlton
Arthur Hoops as Ralph Standish
Rita Stan as Nell
Amy Summers as 'Cinders'
Phillips Tead as Billy Hopkins
Trixie Jennery as Kate
Wellington A. Playter as Schwartz
Augustus Balfour as Joe Barrett 
Marcus Moriarity as Old Bensel

References

External links 
 

1914 films
1910s English-language films
Silent American drama films
1914 drama films
Paramount Pictures films
American black-and-white films
American silent feature films
Films directed by J. Searle Dawley
1910s American films